Diploderma brevicauda is endemic to China.

References

Diploderma
Reptiles of China
Reptiles described in 2012
Taxa named by Ulrich Manthey
Taxa named by Wolfgang Denzer